Francis Michael Christ (born 7 June 1955) is an American mathematician and professor at University of California, Berkeley, specializing in harmonic analysis, partial differential equations, and several complex variables. He is known for the Christ–Kiselev maximal inequality.

Biography
He received in 1977 from Harvey Mudd College his bachelor's degree and in 1982 from the University of Chicago his PhD under the supervision of Alberto Calderón with thesis Restrictions of the Fourier transform to submanifolds of low codimension. At Princeton University, Christ worked with Elias M. Stein from 1982 to 1984 as an instructor and from 1984 to 1986 as an assistant professor. He was at the University of California, Los Angeles (UCLA) from 1986 to 1988 an associate professor and from 1988 to 1996 a full professor. In 1996, he became a full professor at the University of California, Berkeley.

Christ was a Sloan Fellow for the academic year 1986–1987. He was an invited speaker of the International Congress of Mathematicians in 1990 in Kyoto and in 1998 in Berlin. In 1997 he shared with David E. Barrett the Stefan Bergman Prize. He was named to the 2021 class of fellows of the American Mathematical Society "for contributions to harmonic and complex analysis, and linear partial differential equations".

Selected publications

Articles
 Christ, Michael; Journé, Jean-Lin. Polynomial growth estimates for multilinear singular integral operators. Acta Math. 159 (1987), no. 1-2, 51–80.
Christ, Michael. A T(b) theorem with remarks on analytic capacity and the Cauchy integral. Colloq. Math. 60/61 (1990), no. 2, 601–628.
 Christ, F.M.; Weinstein, M.I. Dispersion of small amplitude solutions of the generalized Korteweg-de Vries equation. J. Funct. Anal. 100 (1991), no. 1, 87–109. doi:10.1016/0022-1236(91)90103-C
 Christ, Michael; Kiselev, Alexander. Maximal functions associated to filtrations. J. Funct. Anal. 179 (2001), no. 2, 409–425.
 Christ, Michael; Colliander, James; Tao, Terence. Asymptotics, frequency modulation, and low regularity ill-posedness for canonical defocusing equations. Amer. J. Math. 125 (2003), no. 6, 1235–1293. doi:10.1353/ajm.2003.0040

Books

References

External links

20th-century American mathematicians
21st-century American mathematicians
Harvey Mudd College alumni
University of California, Los Angeles faculty
University of California, Berkeley College of Letters and Science faculty
Complex analysts
Mathematical analysts
1955 births
Living people
Fellows of the American Mathematical Society